The Omukama of Tooro is the name given to the king of Tooro, one of the East African kingdom of Tooro. The kingdom was founded in 1830 by Omukama Kaboyo Olimi l who was the son of Kyebambe lll Nyamutukura, the king of Bunyoro. Since that time, Tooro existed as an independent kingdom until 1967 when President Apollo Milton Obote banned all kingdoms in Uganda. The kingdoms were reinstated as cultural institutions in 1993.

The Omukama of Tooro and the other kings play a vital role in Ugandan politics as cultural leaders and agents of peace and stability in their respective kingdoms. Tooro and Bunyoro kingdoms enjoy a close The Omukama of Tooro and the other kings play a vital role in Ugandan politics as cultural leaders and agents of peace and stability in their respective kingdoms. Tooro and Bunyoro kingdoms enjoy a close rel

List of Abakama (Kings) of Tooro 
The following is a list of the Abakama of Tooro, starting around 1800 AD:

 Kaboyo Olimi I, (Kasunsu Nkwanzi) c. 1830 - 1861
 Kazaana Ruhaga l, c.1861- 1862
 Nyaika Kasunga Kyebambe I, c. 1862-1863 and c. 1864 - 1874
 Kato Rukidi I, 1863-64
 Mukabirere Olimi II, c. 1874 -1876
 Mukarusa Kyebambe II, c. 1876 - 1877
 Isingoma Rukidi ll, c. 1877
 Rubuubi Kyebambe lll c. 1878 and 1879
 Kakende Nyamuyonjo c. 1878 and 1881 - 1882
 Katera Rujwenge, c 1878–1879 a period of Interregnum, 1880–1891; reverted to Bunyoro
 Daudi Kasagama Kyebambe IV, 1891–1928
 George David Kamurasi Rukidi III, 1929–1965
 Patrick David Matthew Kaboyo Olimi III, 1966–1995 interrupted by the discontinuation by the Ugandan government, 1967–1993
 Oyo Nyimba Kabamba Iguru Rukidi IV, 1995–present

See also
 Omukama of Bunyoro
 Kabaka of Buganda
 Toro Kingdom

References

Ugandan monarchies
Toro